Luci Baines Johnson (born July 2, 1947) is an American businesswoman and philanthropist. She is the younger daughter of U.S. President Lyndon B. Johnson and his wife, former First Lady Lady Bird Johnson.

Early years
Born in Washington, D.C., Johnson has an older sister Lynda Bird. Johnson's first name was originally spelled "Lucy"; she changed the spelling in her teens as a rebellion towards her parents. As her parents both had the initials LBJ, they named their two daughters to have these initials also. Although her father was a member of the Christian Church (Disciples of Christ), her mother was an Episcopalian, and she and her older sister, Lynda Bird, were raised as Episcopalians. Johnson converted to Roman Catholicism at the age of eighteen, when she requested and received conditional baptism. Johnson had been baptized with water and in the name of the Trinity at five months old by an Episcopal priest in Austin, Texas. Her rebaptism caused protests from leading figures in the Episcopal Church, which made headlines, as the Roman Catholic teaching does not require converts who are already baptized to receive baptism a second time.

She was sixteen when President John F. Kennedy was assassinated in Dallas on November 22, 1963. Johnson heard of the assassination while attending a Spanish class at the National Cathedral School. She was unaware whether her father had been injured as well but realized he had been sworn in as the 36th President of the United States when Secret Service agents showed up on her school campus a few hours later. She later attended Georgetown University School of Nursing and Health Studies but dropped out in 1966 as the school prohibited married students (Johnson married her first husband in August 1966). In 1966, she learned to cook from Zephyr Wright, the White House chef for the Johnson family.

Career
Since 1993, Johnson has been the Chairman of the Board and manager of LBJ Asset Management Partners, a family office, as well as Chairman of the Board of BusinesSuites, a national operator of executive suites, which she co-founded with her husband in 1989. She received a BLS in Communication from St. Edward's University in 1997.

She is on the board of directors of the LBJ Foundation and has served on multiple civic boards, raising funds for The Lady Bird Johnson Wildflower Center and the American Heart Association, acting as trustee of Boston University, and as a member of the advisory board of the Center for Battered Women.

In 2018, she attended the state funeral of George H. W. Bush alongside her husband Ian Turpin, her sister Lynda Bird Johnson Robb and brother-in-law Charles Robb.

Personal life

Marriages and children

On August 6, 1966, Johnson married Air National Guardsman Patrick John "Pat" Nugent in front of 700 guests at the Basilica of the National Shrine of the Immaculate Conception in Washington, D.C. The wedding was broadcast on television (drawing 55 million viewers) and was featured on the August 19, 1966, cover of Life magazine.

They had four children: Patrick Lyndon (born 1967), a lawyer and a pilot in San Antonio; Nicole Marie (born 1970); Rebekah Johnson (born 1974); and Claudia Taylor Nugent (born 1976). The couple later divorced, and the marriage was annulled by the Catholic Church in August 1979.

On March 3, 1984, she married Ian J. Turpin (born 1944), a Scottish-born Canadian financier; he is president of LBJ Asset Management Partners at LBJ Ranch. Through that marriage, she has a stepson.

Health issues
In April 2010, Johnson was diagnosed with Guillain–Barré syndrome (also known as Landry's paralysis), an autoimmune disorder affecting the peripheral nervous system. She was flown to the Mayo Clinic in Rochester, Minnesota, to begin treatment. Johnson returned to Austin in May 2010. Her doctor called her case "less severe than usual," and she experienced a full recovery.

References

External links 

1947 births
20th-century American businesspeople
20th-century American businesswomen
21st-century American businesspeople
American Roman Catholics
American people of Danish descent 
American people of English descent
American people of Scottish descent
American people of Welsh descent
American philanthropists
Businesspeople from Texas
Businesspeople from Washington, D.C.
Children of presidents of the United States
Children of vice presidents of the United States
Converts to Roman Catholicism from Anglicanism
Former Anglicans
Living people
Luci Baines
St. Edward's University alumni
Texas Democrats
National Cathedral School alumni
Georgetown University School of Nursing alumni
21st-century American businesswomen
People with Guillain–Barré syndrome